William Chalfant (June 22, 1854 – July 31, 1930) was an American roque player who competed in the roque tournament at the 1904 Summer Olympics.

References

1854 births
1930 deaths
American roque players
Olympic roque players of the United States
Roque players at the 1904 Summer Olympics
People from Mount Pleasant, Ohio
Sportspeople from Ohio